The St. Anthony Park Branch Library is a branch of the Saint Paul Public Library in Saint Paul, Minnesota, United States. A Carnegie library built in 1917, it is on the National Register of Historic Places.  In 1999 a rotunda was built on to the back of the building.  This new section houses the branch's children's collection, one of the largest in Saint Paul.

The on-site collection numbered 55,175 items that same year. The branch is open 44 hours per week, Monday to Saturday.

The library branch is considered an icon of the Saint Anthony Park neighborhood.  Primary user groups are neighborhood residents, students and faculty from the nearby University of Minnesota's St. Paul Campus and Luther Seminary, and students from two nearby public schools.  One-third of users come from Minneapolis and suburban Ramsey County.  To serve the many U of M graduate students and their families from who are from Asia, the branch has the city's primary collection of Chinese and Korean language materials.

The St. Anthony Park Branch is unique in having its own community advocacy group, the St. Anthony Park Library Association (SAPLA), in addition to the overall Friends of the St. Paul Public Library.  The annual St. Anthony Park Arts Festival began on the library's front lawn and now sprawls for more than a block.  During the festival, which is the first Saturday in June, the library holds a very large used book sale.

External links

Saint Paul Public Library
St. Anthony Park Branch Library profile (.pdf)
St. Anthony Park Arts Festival

Beaux-Arts architecture in Minnesota
Carnegie libraries in Minnesota
Libraries on the National Register of Historic Places in Minnesota
Library buildings completed in 1917
National Register of Historic Places in Saint Paul, Minnesota
Public libraries in Minnesota